The Granny is a 1995 American horror comedy film directed by Luca Bercovici and written by Bercovici and Sam Bernard. The film stars Stella Stevens as a grandmother who comes back from her grave to seek revenge on her greedy family. After a limited release at drive-in theaters, the film was printed directly to VHS video format.

Noted by collectors of modern B-movies for its poor script and amateur acting, The Granny has been called "one of the finer pieces of trash".

Synopsis
The family of a wealthy woman named Anastasia "Granny" Gargoli (Stella Stevens) wants her to die so they can inherit her insurance. Granny is given an eternal life potion by a mysterious preacher Namon Ami (Luca Bercovici). Although the preacher admonishes her not to take it in sunlight, Granny ignores him and drinks it in broad daylight. She melts into nothing but arises from a grave as a vampire-like monster. Granny starts killing her family to prevent them from inheriting her fortune. It is up to Kelly (Shannon Whirry) and Amy (Samantha Hendricks) to stop the blood hungry, vampire-like granny.

Cast
 Stella Stevens as Granny
 Shannon Whirry as Kelly; Whirry made appearances on several television shows including Seinfeld, Murphy Brown and Silk Stalkings.
 Samantha Hendricks as Amy
 Sandy Helberg as Albert
 Brant von Hoffman as David. Hoffman is known for his roles in Police Academy and Guarding Tess.
 Patricia Sturges as Andrea
 Ryan Bollman as Junior
 Heather Elizabeth Parkhurst as Antionette. Parkhurst was a member of the Swedish Bikini Team featured in beer ads and appeared in Playboy in August 1991 and January 1992.
 Joseph Bernard as Mr. Sadler
 Luca Bercovici as Namon Ami

Production

Music
The film score was composed by noted Hollywood composer Kendall Schmidt (famous for re-scoring Witchfinder General when it was released on VHS). The film also featured the song Hard Feelings by the heavy rock band Blackthorne from their album Afterlife.

Release

Rating
Initially the film was to be given NC-17, but eventually was rated R for violence and gore, crude sexuality and language.

References

External links
 Granny Games
 
 The Granny Movie Review Something Awful, January 20, 2000

1990s comedy horror films
American comedy horror films
1995 comedy films
1995 films
Films directed by Luca Bercovici
1990s English-language films
1990s American films